Neopotamia atrigrapta is a moth of the family Tortricidae. It is found in Vietnam.

The wingspan is about 21 mm. The ground colour of the forewings is cream sprinkled with pale brownish grey and suffused with pale ferruginous in the costal and terminal areas. The hindwings are pale brownish.

Etymology
The name refers to the black colour of the costal marking and cilia and is derived from Latin ater (meaning black) and Greek grapta (meaning painted).

References

Moths described in 2009
Olethreutini
Moths of Asia
Taxa named by Józef Razowski